The 2003 No Way Out was the fifth No Way Out professional wrestling pay-per-view (PPV) event produced by World Wrestling Entertainment (WWE). It was held for wrestlers from the promotion's Raw and SmackDown! brand divisions. The event took place on February 23, 2003, at the Bell Centre in Montreal, Quebec, Canada. It was the first No Way Out produced under the WWE name, after the promotion was renamed from World Wrestling Federation (WWF) to WWE in May 2002, as well as the first held under the first brand extension that began in March 2002. This was also the first WWE pay-per-view held in Montreal since the infamous Montreal Screwjob at Survivor Series in 1997.

The main event from the SmackDown! brand was a rematch from WrestleMania X8 between Hulk Hogan and The Rock, which The Rock won by pinfall after Sylvain Grenier, the referee of the match, allowed Rock to hit Hogan with a steel chair, which proceeded to a Rock Bottom. The main event from the Raw brand was a World Heavyweight Championship match between Triple H and Scott Steiner, which Triple H won via pinfall, after he hit Steiner with the championship belt and a Pedigree. The primary match on the undercard from Raw was the encounter of Steve Austin and Eric Bischoff, which Austin won via pinfall after three consecutive Stone Cold Stunners. The main match on the undercard from SmackDown! was a six-man tag team match between Team Angle (Kurt Angle, Charlie Haas, and Shelton Benjamin) and the team of Brock Lesnar, Edge, and Chris Benoit, where Edge was unable to participate in the match due to injury. The match, however, was won by Lesnar and Benoit via submission, after Benoit forced Haas to submit to the Crippler Crossface.

Production

Background
No Way Out was first held by World Wrestling Entertainment (WWE) as the 20th In Your House pay-per-view (PPV) in February 1998. Following the discontinuation of the In Your House series in 1999, No Way Out returned in February 2000 as its own PPV event, thus establishing it as the annual February PPV for the promotion. The 2003 event was the fifth event in the No Way Out chronology and was held on February 23 at the Bell Centre in Montreal, Quebec, Canada. It was also the first held under the WWE name, as the promotion was renamed from World Wrestling Federation (WWF) to WWE in May 2002. It was also the first No Way Out held during the brand extension that was introduced in March 2002, a storyline subdivision in which the promotion divided its roster into two separate brands, Raw and SmackDown!, where wrestlers were exclusively assigned to perform. The 2003 event in turn featured wrestlers from both brands.

Storylines
On the January 23 episode of SmackDown!, SmackDown! General Manager Stephanie McMahon announced the return of Hulk Hogan to WWE. During the returning segment of Hogan, the WWE Chairman, Vince McMahon, came down to the ring to insult Hogan, resulting in Hogan challenging McMahon into a match. However, Hogan then proceeded to attack McMahon. The attack led to McMahon accepting Hogan's challenge. On the January 30 episode of SmackDown! however, McMahon instead booked a rematch from WrestleMania X8 between Hogan and his representative, The Rock at No Way Out; thus reigniting the Rock-Hogan feud. During the weeks leading to No Way Out, both Rock and Hogan cut promos on who was the better wrestler. The feud intensified on the February 20 episode of SmackDown! where The Rock made his first live appearance on WWE television in 6 months. Rock acted genuine as if he was attempting to shake Hogan's hand, but then spat water into Hogan's face, turning heel in the process.

At the Royal Rumble, Kurt Angle successfully defended the WWE Championship against Chris Benoit, while Brock Lesnar won the Royal Rumble match later in the night to earn himself a WWE Championship match at WrestleMania XIX. On the January 23 episode of SmackDown!, Kurt Angle confronted his protégés, Team Angle (Charlie Haas and Shelton Benjamin), about their losses that night, as Benjamin was pinned by Edge, while Haas was pinned by Benoit. On the January 30 episode of SmackDown!, Haas and Benjamin were booked in a tag team match against Edge and Benoit. During the match, Angle interfered in Haas and Benjamin's behalf, which allowed them to pin Edge and Benoit for the win. Haas and Benjamin would then defeat the then-reigning WWE Tag Team Champions, Los Guerreros, to win the WWE Tag Team Championship on the February 6 episode of SmackDown!. On the February 13 episode of SmackDown!, General Manager Stephanie McMahon announced a match between Team Angle (Angle, Haas, and Benjamin) against the team of Lesnar, Benoit, and Edge at No Way Out, thus the official beginning of the Team Angle-Team Lesnar feud. On the February 20 episode of SmackDown!, Angle was booked in a match against Lesnar, however, before the match started, Angle stated that Lesnar had to defeat Haas and Benjamin before he could wrestle Angle, which Lesnar was able to do. As Lesnar then wrestled Angle, Paul Heyman, who was at ringside, interfered in the match and hit Lesnar with a steel chair, causing Angle to lose by disqualification.

On the January 20 episode of Raw, Eric Bischoff made an announcement about how Stone Cold Steve Austin walked out on the WWE during the summer of 2002 with no explanation and that he would like to give Austin an opportunity to give his side of the story. Bischoff also invited Austin to make an appearance at No Way Out. On the January 27 episode of Raw, Bischoff stated that Austin has agreed to tell his story in the Raw magazine. On the February 3 episode of Raw, Bischoff headed to Texas, to sign Austin to the Raw brand. But, he was unsuccessful in doing so, as he could not locate Austin anywhere. On the February 10 episode of Raw, Bischoff (kayfabe) fired Jim Ross, after Bischoff stated that it was Ross' fault that Austin had not signed yet to the brand. Vince McMahon had stated the previous week that he would fire Bischoff and Chief Morley due to the way they were running Raw the last couple of weeks, and due to the fact that Bischoff had not yet signed Austin to the Raw brand. That night, McMahon asked Bischoff if he had signed Austin yet, which prompted Bischoff to say "no". Before McMahon could fire Bischoff, however, Ross informed McMahon that Austin would be at No Way Out, which led to McMahon booking a match between Bischoff and Austin at No Way Out.

At the Royal Rumble, a scheduled match for the World Heavyweight Championship saw Triple H defend the title against Scott Steiner. The match saw Steiner defeat Triple H by disqualification, after Triple H brought a sledgehammer in during the match. As a result, Triple H retained the World Heavyweight Championship. On the January 20 episode of Raw, Steiner was put in a match against Batista. In the match, Batista was disqualified after ininterference from Randy Orton. After the match, Triple H, Ric Flair, Orton and Batista all attacked Steiner, which led to Triple H performing a Pedigree on Steiner. On the February 3 episode of Raw, Triple H officially formed the stable known as Evolution with Flair, Orton, and Batista. That same night, a number one contender's match was scheduled between Chris Jericho and Steiner, in which the winner would meet Triple H at No Way Out for the World Heavyweight Championship. The match saw Steiner defeat Jericho.

Event

Preliminary matches

Before the event aired live on pay-per-view, Rey Mysterio defeated Jamie Noble on Sunday Night Heat. The first match was between Jeff Hardy and Chris Jericho. Jericho forced Hardy to submit to the Walls of Jericho to win the match.

Next was a World Tag Team Championship match between Kane and Rob Van Dam and William Regal and Lance Storm. After Storm pulled Kane's mask, preventing him from seeing, Kane executed a Chokeslam on Van Dam. Storm pinned Van Dam to retain the title.

The third match was a Cruiserweight Championship match between Matt Hardy and Billy Kidman. Hardy executed a Twist of Fate off the top rope to win the title.

Next was a match between The Big Show and The Undertaker. Undertaker forced Big Show to pass out to a Triangle Choke to win the match.

Main event matches
In the fifth match, Team Angle (Kurt Angle, Charlie Haas, and Shelton Benjamin) faced Brock Lesnar and Chris Benoit in a 3-on-2 Handicap Match. Before the match, Edge was attacked backstage and it was announced he was unable to compete, thus make it 3-on-2. Edge had suffered a severe neck injury prior to the event, and was forced to be written off of television for the foreseeable future. Lesnar and Benoit won the match after Benoit forced Haas to submit to the Crippler Crossface.

Next was a World Heavyweight Championship match between Scott Steiner and Triple H. After Evolution (Ric Flair, Randy Orton and Batista) interfered, Steiner attacked them, which caused the referee, Earl Hebner, to eject them. Triple H hit Steiner with the title belt and executed a Pedigree to retain the title.

The final match on the undercard was a match between Eric Bischoff and Steve Austin. Before the match began, Bischoff offered Austin a chance to forfeit the match, but Austin attacked him instead. Bischoff attempted to escape by running around ringside only to be attacked once again by Austin. As Austin rolled Bischoff back into the ring, he performed the Stone Cold Stunner on Bischoff. As Austin pinned Bischoff, Austin deliberately broke the pinfall to perform two more Stunners on Bischoff to win the match.

The main event was the WrestleMania X8 rematch between Hulk Hogan and The Rock. The Rock executed a Rock Bottom on Hogan and applied two consecutive People's Elbows. Hogan performed a Big Boot and a Leg drop but as the referee counted the pinfall, the lights in the arena went off. As the lights came back on, the referee, Sylvain Grenier, was unconscious, allowing Vince McMahon to distract Hogan, which allowed the referee to hand a steel chair to Rock, which he hit Hogan with. The Rock executed a Rock Bottom to win the match.

Aftermath
On the February 27 episode of SmackDown!, Vince McMahon announced that The Rock had chosen to be part of the Raw brand, thus making him Raw exclusive and ending the Rock-Hogan feud. On the Raw brand, Rock immediately began a feud with Stone Cold Steve Austin, and on the March 3 episode of Raw, Rock challenged Austin to a match at WrestleMania XIX. However, Raw General Manager Eric Bischoff announced that if Rock defeated Booker T the following week on Raw, he would have the choice to either face Austin or have a World Heavyweight Championship match against Triple H at WrestleMania. The following week on Raw, Rock announced that instead of facing Booker T, he would choose his own opponent, in which he chose The Hurricane. During the match, however, Austin came out to the ring and distracted Rock, which allowed Hurricane to roll up Rock into a pinfall; despite losing the match, Rock chose Austin as his WrestleMania opponent. At WrestleMania, Rock defeated Austin via pinfall.

After No Way Out, Vince McMahon continued his feud with Hulk Hogan, in which he proclaimed that Hulkamania was dead and proclaiming a new mania; McMahonamania. On the March 6 episode of SmackDown!, Hogan informed McMahon that Hulkamania was not dead and that McMahon had nothing to do with creating it. McMahon informed Hogan that he did not hate Hulkamaniacs or Hulkamania, but he hated Hogan; McMahon explained that he hated Hogan, because he left WWE and went to work for Ted Turner's promotion World Championship Wrestling (WCW). McMahon also stated that he hated Hogan for the fact that Hogan testified against him in his steroid trial. McMahon challenged Hogan to a Street Fight at WrestleMania XIX, to the stipulation that if he beat Hogan, he would never wrestle again and stating he would kill Hulkamania. On the March 20 episode of SmackDown!, the contract signing between McMahon and Hogan's match at WrestleMania took place. During the contract signing, McMahon attacked Hogan from behind with a steel chair. The attack led to McMahon stabbing Hogan with a pen in the forehead and forcing him to sign the contract in Hogan's blood. At WrestleMania, Hogan defeated McMahon in after three Leg drops.

Although the 2003 No Way Out featured wrestlers from both Raw and SmackDown!, the following year's event was made exclusive to the SmackDown! brand.

Results

See also

Professional wrestling in Canada

References

External links
Official No Way Out 2003 Website 

Professional wrestling shows in Montreal
2003
2003 in Canada
2003 WWE pay-per-view events
February 2003 events in Canada
WWE in Canada

es:WWE No Way Out#2003